Dekha is a 2001 Bengali drama film directed by Goutam Ghose. This was Ghose's ninth feature film and it was a successful one. At the 48th National Film Awards, the film was awarded Best Feature Film in Bengali, while Soumitra Chatterjee was awarded the Special Jury Award.

Plot
The film revolves around an ageing poet Sashi Bhusan Sanyal afflicted with glaucoma and nearly blind whose wife has deserted him because of his reckless lifestyle.

Cast 
 Soumitra Chatterjee as Sashi Bhusan Sanyal
 Debashree Roy as Sarama
 Roopa Ganguly as Sashi Bhusan's wife
 Indrani Haldar as Reema
 Biplab Chatterjee as Biplob
 Haradhan Bannerjee as Sarama's father
 Paran Bandyopadhyay
 Anjan Dutt as Sarama's husband
 Kamal Kanjilal as Gagan Chandra Goon

References

External links 
 
 

2001 films
Films about blind people in India
Bengali-language Indian films
Films about writers
Best Bengali Feature Film National Film Award winners
2000s Bengali-language films
Films directed by Goutam Ghose
Indian drama films